Preston Steiger (September 6, 1898 – November 13, 1931) was an American water polo player. He competed in the men's tournament at the 1920 Summer Olympics.

See also
 List of men's Olympic water polo tournament goalkeepers

References

External links
 

1898 births
1931 deaths
Sportspeople from San Francisco
American male water polo players
Water polo goalkeepers
Olympic water polo players of the United States
Water polo players at the 1920 Summer Olympics